The 2022 South Alabama Jaguars softball team represented the University of South Alabama during the 2022 NCAA Division I softball season. The Jaguars played their home games at Jaguar Field. The Jaguars were led by sixteenth-year head coach Becky Clark and were members of the Sun Belt Conference.

Preseason

Sun Belt Conference Coaches Poll
The Sun Belt Conference Coaches Poll was released on January 31, 2022. South Alabama was picked to finish fourth in the conference with 74 votes.

Preseason All-Sun Belt team

Olivia Lackie (USA, Pitcher)
Leanna Johnson (TROY, Pitcher)
Kandra Lamb (LA, Pitcher)
Jessica Mullins (TXST, Pitcher)
Kamdyn Kvistad (USA, Catcher)
Sophie Piskos (LA, Catcher)
Faith Shirley (GASO, 1st Base)
Kelly Horne (TROY, 2nd Base)
Daisy Hess (GSU, Shortstop)
Sara Vanderford (TXST, 3rd Base)
Iyanla De Jesus (CCU, Designated Player)
Raina O'Neal (LA, Outfielder)
Mackenzie Brasher (USA, Outfielder)
Emily Brown (GSU, Outfielder)
Jade Sinness (TROY, Outfielder)

National Softball Signing Day

Personnel

Schedule and results

Schedule Source:
*Rankings are based on the team's current ranking in the NFCA/USA Softball poll.

References

South Alabama
South Alabama Jaguars softball
South Alabama Jaguars softball seasons